is a Japanese footballer who plays for Kawasaki Frontale.

Club statistics
Last update: 4 December 2021.

1Includes J. League Championship and Japanese Super Cup.

National team statistics

International career
On 7 May 2015, Japan's coach Vahid Halilhodžić called him for a two-days training camp.

Honours

Club
J1 League (4) : 2017, 2018, 2020, 2021
Emperor's Cup (1) : 2020
J.League Cup (1) : 2019
Japanese Super Cup (2) : 2019, 2021

Individual
 J.League Best XI (2) : 2017, 2018

References

External links

Profile at Kawasaki Frontale

1992 births
Living people
University of Tsukuba alumni
Association football people from Kumamoto Prefecture
Japanese footballers
J1 League players
Kawasaki Frontale players
Association football defenders
Japan international footballers
Universiade bronze medalists for Japan
Universiade medalists in football
Medalists at the 2013 Summer Universiade